Onycodes traumataria is a species of moth of the family Geometridae first described by Achille Guenée in 1857. It is found in the Australia, including New South Wales and Tasmania.

References

Oenochrominae
Moths of Australia
Moths described in 1857